Denzel Comenentia (born 25 November 1995) is a Dutch athlete specialising in the hammer throw and shot put. He won silver medals in the latter at the 2014 World Junior Championships and 2017 European U23 Championships.

His personal best in the hammer is 76.81 metres set in Torance in 2019. This is the current national record. His personal best in the shot put is 20.88 metres set in Knoxville in 2018.

International competitions

References

1995 births
Living people
Athletes from Amsterdam
Dutch male hammer throwers
Dutch male shot putters
Dutch expatriate sportspeople in the United States
Dutch Athletics Championships winners
Georgia Bulldogs track and field athletes
20th-century Dutch people
21st-century Dutch people